Julien Taurines (born 23 July 1978) is a French retired Paralympic judoka who competed at international judo competitions. He is a Paralympic bronze medalist, World bronze medalist and two-time European silver medalist.

References

External links
 
 

1978 births
Living people
Sportspeople from Montpellier
Paralympic judoka of France
French male judoka
Judoka at the 2004 Summer Paralympics
Judoka at the 2008 Summer Paralympics
Judoka at the 2012 Summer Paralympics
Judoka at the 2015 European Games
Medalists at the 2008 Summer Paralympics
Paralympic bronze medalists for France
Paralympic medalists in judo
20th-century French people
21st-century French people